Paul Onwuanibe (Born 29 June 1965) is an African business magnate. He is best known as the MD/CEO of Landmark Group – an African-focused real estate and serviced office company having over 500 companies as clients with offices in five continents.

Onwuanibe was born in Paddington, London to George Onwuanibe. and Dorothy Onwuanibe. His parents are of Nigerian descent. He has one elder sister, Angela, and one elder brother, Anthony. 

He attended primary and part of his secondary school in the United Kingdom with a brief stint at Eton College for boys. At 16, he was admitted into the University of Nigeria where he obtained a BSc (Hons) in Architecture.

Onwuanibe returned to London after his first degree and proceeded to South Bank University, London in 1989 for a Masters in Construction Project management followed by a Masters in Environmental Design and property development from Imperial College, London in 1990. In 1993 he obtained an MBA from the London Business School with a distinction for his dissertation on the Value chain analysis.

He is a devoted family man who loves to spend time with his children.

Career 
1988 Project Architect – Anthony Barber Associates (Chartered Architects) UK
1991 Development Director for Beacon Housing UK
1994 Executive responsible for Property and Logistics team Regus Plc - a global serviced office company
1997 Chief Executive Officer Landmark Group 

Paul serves on the board of many companies in Africa including One Finance(a Micro Finance bank in Africa) and Federation for Cancer Care West Africa.
He is also, the founder and past president of the prestigious charity; The Human Race Foundation (HRF). A charity dedicated to providing young men with a chance in life. He is presently an investor in the popular African investment show "Lions Den"

Marriage 
In 1993, he married a medical doctor, Dr (Mrs) Ikunna Onwuanibe; they have two children Ugochi and Chika.

References 

1966 births
Living people
University of Nigeria alumni
Alumni of Imperial College London